Tijucas do Sul is a municipality in the state of Paraná in the Southern Region of Brazil. It is known for its horse ranches and attracts tourists all year round.

The municipality contains 10% of the  Guaratuba Environmental Protection Area, created in 1992.

As of 2020, it has a population of 17,084.

See also
List of municipalities in Paraná

References

Municipalities in Paraná